This is a list of notable kosher supermarkets. A kosher supermarket is an establishment that sells food that complies with Jewish dietary laws (kashrut).

Kosher supermarkets typically operate under rabbinical supervision, which requires that kashrut, as well as certain other Jewish laws, must be observed. Kosher supermarkets are typically Shomer Shabbat, being closed from sundown Friday night to sundown Saturday night, as well as during most Jewish holidays.

Kosher supermarkets

See also 
Kosher restaurants
List of kosher restaurants

References

External links